On June 19, 2007, the U.S. state of Georgia held a special election to fill a vacancy in Georgia's 10th congressional district. A runoff was held on July 17 with Paul Broun defeating Jim Whitehead by less than 1%.

History
The vacancy was created by the death of incumbent Republican Charlie Norwood. Norwood won reelection in 2006 with 67% of the vote.

Since this is a nonpartisan special election, all candidates for the election were listed alphabetically, though their party affiliations are noted on the ballot. According to Georgia law, to win outright, a candidate needed a majority vote; since no candidate won more than 50% of the vote, the top two finishers competed in a runoff election on July 17, 2007.

Candidates
The following candidates were on the June 19 ballot. They are listed here alphabetically: first by party, then by name.

Democratic
Denise Freeman – Baptist minister and 1998/2000 Democratic nominee
James Marlow – Yahoo! Marketing executive
Evita Paschall – Attorney

Libertarian
Jim Sendelbach – Psychotherapist

Republican
Paul Broun – Physician, nominee for GA-03 in 1990, candidate in 1992, and candidate for U.S. Senate in 1996
William L. Greene – Conservative activist, American political science professor, and faithless elector (2016)
Mark Myers – Realtor & previous candidate
Nate Pulliam – Former soldier in the US Army & Realtor
Erik Underwood – Former Congressional Aide & Political consultant
Jim Whitehead – St. Senator, 2005–2007

Results
No candidate received a majority in the June 19 election so a runoff between Republicans Jim Whitehead and Paul Broun  was held on July 17. Democrat James Marlow, the third-place finisher, had the right to request a recount within 48 hours of the official certification of the election results on June 25, 2007, due to the very small difference in total votes for himself and Broun, but did not do so.

The official returns for the June 19 election and the July 17 run-off are:

See also
List of special elections to the United States House of Representatives

References

External links

Candidate Web Sites

Democratic
Denise Freeman for Congress web site
James Marlow for Congress web site
Evita Paschall for Congress web site

Libertarian
Jim Sendelbach for Congress web site

Republican
Paul Broun for Congress web site
Bill Greene for Congress web site
Mark Myers for Congress web site
Nate Pulliam for Congress web site
Erik Underwood for Congress web site
Jim Whitehead for Congress web site

Georgia 2007 10
2007 10
Georgia 10
Georgia 2007 10
June 2007 events in the United States
2007 Georgia (U.S. state) elections